Kgalebane Montebatsi Lydia Mohlakoana (born 10 December 1993) is a South African soccer player who plays as a midfielder for the South Africa women's national team.

International career
Mohlakoana competed for the South Africa women's national soccer team at the 2018 Africa Women Cup of Nations, playing in one match.

References

1993 births
Living people
South African women's soccer players
South Africa women's international soccer players
Women's association football midfielders